Nikki Ayers is an Australian Paralympic rower. She was a member of the PR3 Mix 4+ at the 2020 Tokyo Paralympics.

Personal
Ayers was born 3 March 1991. She grew up in Narooma, New South Wales and moved to Canberra to study for a nursing degree at University of Canberra. Ayers played rugby union and captained the ACT Women's Brumbies 7's team. In 2016, during a rugby union game, a tackle led to her dislocating her knee. the injury severed a major artery and nerve damage caused her to lose feeling in her foot. She underwent 16 operations to save her leg and repair her knee. In 2021, she works as a registered nurse in the Intensive Care Unit at The Canberra Hospital and has a postgraduate Diploma in Critical Care.

Rowing
Ayers competed twice in the gruelling surf boat George Bass Marathon along the South Coast. Ayers' road to para rowing started through a 2017 Train4Tokyo session at the Australian Institute of Sport. She commenced serious rowing training in January 2018 and was selected in the PR3 mixed coxed four at the 2018 World Rowing Championships where the crew finished fifth.

She has won PR3 Women's Single Scull at Australian Rowing Championships in 2019 and 2021.

At the 2020 Summer Paralympics, Ayers was a member of the PR3 Mix 4+ along with Tom Birtwhistle, James Talbot, Alexandra Viney. Their cox was Renae Domaschenz. They qualified for the final after winning their Repechage with time of 7:06.98 but came fourth in the final and failed to win a medal.

Ayers is a member of the Capital Lakes Rowing Club.

References

External links

1991 births
Living people
Rowers at the 2020 Summer Paralympics
Paralympic rowers of Australia
Australian female rowers
People from the South Coast (New South Wales)
Sportswomen from New South Wales
21st-century Australian women